Rabah Aboud (born 1 January 1981 at Tissemsilt) is an Algerian Athlete long-distance and cross country runner.

Competition record

External links 
 
 http://fr.london2012.com/fr/athlete/aboud-rabah-1076409/

Algerian male long-distance runners
1981 births
Athletes (track and field) at the 2012 Summer Olympics
Olympic athletes of Algeria
People from Tissemsilt
Living people
Mediterranean Games gold medalists for Algeria
Athletes (track and field) at the 2013 Mediterranean Games
Athletes (track and field) at the 2022 Mediterranean Games
Mediterranean Games medalists in athletics
Athletes (track and field) at the 2011 All-Africa Games
African Games competitors for Algeria
21st-century Algerian people